The Intelligence College in Europe (ICE) is an intergovernmental entity, independent of the European Union institutions, which has been inaugurated on 5 March 2019 in Paris. ICE aims to bring together all the intelligence communities (civilian, military, internal, external and technical services) of European countries, national and European decision-makers as well as the academic world in order to stimulate strategic thinking and thus develop a common intelligence culture.

History 
In his speech on the future of Europe delivered on 27 September 2017 at the Sorbonne, the President of the French Republic, Emmanuel Macron, proposed the creation of a "European Intelligence Academy", which would serve as a crucible for the emergence of a common strategic culture.

In particular, he states:"What Europe lacks most today, this Europe of Defence, is a common strategic culture. [...] We do not have the same cultures, whether they be parliamentary, historical or political, nor do we have the same sensitivities. And we will not change that in a day. But I propose right now to try to build this culture together, by proposing a European initiative [...] aimed at developing this shared strategic culture. [...] I would therefore like to see the establishment of a European Intelligence Academy to strengthen the links between our countries through training and exchange activities."Emmanuel Macron will rename this initiative "Intelligence College in Europe" on the occasion of the inaugural event in Paris on 5 March 2019. This meeting brought together high-level representatives of sixty-six intelligence services from thirty European countries. The thirty countries were the 27 EU Member states as well as Norway, the United Kingdom and Switzerland.

On 26 February 2020, twenty-three states met in Zagreb to sign the letter of intent, which formalises and perpetuates the existence of the Intelligence College in Europe, setting out a governance framework. These 23 states are Austria, Belgium, Croatia, Cyprus, the Czech Republic, Denmark, Estonia, Finland, France, Germany, Hungary, Italy, Latvia, Lithuania, Malta, the Netherlands, Norway, Portugal, Romania, Slovenia, Spain, Sweden, and the United Kingdom.

Out of the 30 countries initially meeting in Paris on 5 March 2019, seven of them chose to have a partner status, which is less restrictive but still allows them to participate in certain activities: Bulgaria, Greece, Ireland, Luxembourg, Poland, Slovakia, and Switzerland. These countries may eventually become members of the College by signing the Letter of Intent.

Organisation 
The Intelligence College Europe operates on a three-tier organisation, comprising:

 the Steering Committee – a decision-making body representing the member countries,

 the Presidency – held by one country in annual rotation and assisted by a Troika comprising both previous and future presidencies,

 the Permanent Secretariat – responsible for the implementation of decisions, based at the Ecole Militaire in Paris

List of the Presidencies of the Intelligence College in Europe:

 Croatia - statement by Director General of SOA, Mr. Daniel Markić (2020),
 United Kingdom - Declaration of Mrs. Beth Sizeland (2021),
 Italy - Message of Ambassador Elisabetta Belloni (2022),
 Romania - Message of Professor Adrian Ivan (2023).

List of the directors of the Permanent Secretariat:

 Yasmine Gouédard (2020-2022)
 François Fischer (since 2022)

Missions 
The Intelligence College in Europe aims at stimulating strategic thinking, thus developing a common intelligence culture by:

 promoting the sharing of experience and professional cultures;
 raising awareness of intelligence issues;
 building bridges between academia, intelligence communities and the civil society.

Activities 
The College proposes three types of activities, organised by member countries:

 Thematic Seminars and webinars
 Outreach sessions
 Academic Programme.

In order to pursue these activities, the ICE is supported by a dedicated Academic Network.

Related items 
 National Centre for Counter Terrorism
 Joint European Union Intelligence School
 European Union Institute for Security Studies
 European Centre of Excellence for Countering Hybrid Threats

Notes and references 

Organizations established in 2019
Intergovernmental organizations
Intelligence education
Organizations based in Paris